Acleris britannia, the Brittania moth, is a species of moth of the family Tortricidae. It is found in North America, where it has been recorded from Alberta, British Columbia, California, Oregon, Saskatchewan and Washington.

The forewings are pale orange yellow with a large purple-brown pale-centered costal triangle and slight dark sprinkling or reticulation (a net-like pattern). Adults have been recorded on wing from June to October.

The larvae feed on Rubus occidentalis, Rubus parviflorus, Rubus ursinus, Potentilla and Rosa species.

References

Moths described in 1904
britannia
Moths of North America